Minister for Food, Agriculture and Fisheries of Denmark is the politically appointed head of the Danish Ministry of Food, Agriculture and Fisheries, and a member of the Cabinet. Since 19 November 2020, Rasmus Prehn, from the social democratic party Socialdemokratiet, has served as Minister for Food, Agriculture and Fisheries in the Mette Frederiksen I cabinet.

The ministry and the minister post was created in 1896; the ministry was originally named the Ministry of Agriculture. In 1929 the Directorate of Fishing was spun off into the separate Ministry of Shipping and Fishing, but that ministry was reabsorbed in 1935, and the name changed to Ministry of Agriculture and Fishing. In 1947 the Ministry of Fishing was created again, and the name changed to the Ministry of Agriculture, and this time it lasted until 1994 where it was again folded into the Ministry of Agriculture and Fishing. On 30 December 1996 the name of the ministry was changed to the current Ministry of Food, Agriculture and Fisheries, often just called the Ministry of Food.

List of Ministers

References

History of the Ministry - From the Danish Ministry of Food, Agriculture and Fisheries (In Danish).
Lists of Danish governments since 1848
Danish Governments - From Folketinget.

External links
Danish Ministry of Food, Agriculture and Fisheries - Official webpage.

Food, Agriculture and Fisheries
Agriculture in Denmark
Denmark